Two male athletes from Syria  competed at the 1996 Summer Paralympics in Atlanta, United States.

See also
Syria at the Paralympics
Syria at the 1996 Summer Olympics

References 

Nations at the 1996 Summer Paralympics
1996
Summer Paralympics